Ambor is a rural locality (a village) in Cherdynsky District, Perm Krai, Russia. The population was 40 as of 2010. There are 3 streets.

Geography 
Ambor is located 55 km southwest of Cherdyn (the district's administrative centre) by road. Pechinki is the nearest rural locality.

References 

Rural localities in Cherdynsky District